John Paul Caponigro (born June 23, 1965 Boston) is an Environmental Fine Art Landscape Photographer. He is the son of the American photographer Paul Caponigro and Eleanor Caponigro a graphic designer.  John Paul attended Yale University, and the University of California, Santa Cruz where he was trained as a painter and later as a photographer. After college John moved to Maine and became an artist in residence at The Center for Creative Imaging. John now works with photo-based digital imaging as his primary medium.  Dan Steinhardt of Epson considers John Paul "...one of the great mentors of the photographic medium". The American photographer Joyce Tenneson has said, "John Paul Caponigro is the rare combination of gifted artist and master technician. He  works from the heart to create images that are poetic and evocative, and at times, mystical.  He is someone whose sensitivity and intelligence work to break new ground, and someone I will enjoy watching in the years to come.". He has been awarded membership into many photographic organizations including the Photoshop Hall of Fame, the Epson Stylus Pros, Xrite Coloratti, and the Canon Explorers of Light. His work crosses the lines between photography and painting and displays knowledge of painterly composition and color theory, coupled with content of modern science, psychology, primal cultures, and the environment.  The photographer Arnold Newman stated,"...Caponigro's mysterious and magical images go beyond reality or surrealism. He has created a wonderful new world of his own". John Paul Caponigro lives in Cushing, Maine with his photographer wife Arduina, and their son.

Exhibits 
From 1990 to 2011 John Paul Caponigro has had over 110 group and solo shows.  He has shown internationally in Italy at the Museo Archeologico Regionale, Val d’Aosta, and the VIR, SpA, Milan.  John has shown his work in the United States in galleries and museums such as the Palm Beach Photographic Centre Museum, Delray Beach, FL and the Pingree Gallery in East Hampton, NY, and the Pasadena Museum of California Art, CA. He has a yearly gallery showing of his newest work each August at his gallery/studio in Cushing, ME.

Collections 
John Paul's photographic work is included in corporate and museum collections. These include Estée Lauder and Pfizer, Princeton University and The Museum of Fine Arts Houston.  The Smithsonian Museum of American National History has a collection of John Paul's work that includes one of every media that he has used.  This collection includes his early silver gelatin prints, his current pigmented ink prints, preliminary sketches and his print-on-demand books. The Smithsonian is also collecting the tools he uses to produce his work, this includes his software, computers, printers, cameras and cell phones.

John interviewed over 40 of the great American photographers from 1995 through 2007. These dialogs were published in Camera Arts Magazine the audio tapes of which are now archived at the Eastman House Library, Rochester, New York.  The transcripts of these dialogs can be viewed on John Paul Caponigro's website.

Lectures 
John Paul Caponigro lectures at trade-shows, professional organizations, educational institutions, and corporations, including: MIT, Penn State, RIT, Microsoft, Photo Plus, ASMP and Photoshop World. In 2010 John spoke on creativity for TEDx Dirgo.

Awards
In 2002 Caponigro won the honor of being voted one of Zoom Magazine's 15 Best Artists of Past 30 Years. In 2003 he was Photo District News' Annual Winner, and in 2008 he won the Communication Arts Award of Excellence.

Workshops 
Caponigro runs International and American landscape workshops.  He has traveled to Antarctica 3 times  leading photographic workshops. Pieces of his Antarctica work have been shown at the Peabody Essex Museum in Salem Massachusetts in 2008.  He has done workshops in South Africa and Namibia, and works with Focus on Nature in Iceland doing workshops with them since 2008.  In 2010 John and fellow Canon Explorer of Light photographer, Seth Resnick, began running international workshops together through Digital Photo Destinations, an international field workshop company which holds workshops in Antarctica, Greenland and Patagonia. His American field destination workshops included desert destinations such as White Sands, New Mexico, Arches National Park in Utah, Death Valley, CA and Santa Fe, New Mexico. John teaches field photography workshops on Maine Islands, and Maine Fall Foliage out of his studio in Cushing, Maine.

Next Step 
John runs printing and creativity workshops out of his Maine studio. Known as a master printer  he offers printing workshops for students who wish to turn their images into fine art prints.  The John Paul Caponigro Next Step Alumni Group was formed in 1998 when a handful of students requested custom workshops to increase their photographic creativity.  The Next Step group has grown from this small body of students to just under 100 photographers. Membership into this group is by invitation only, and group dynamics are a factor in nomination.  The Next Step group have held exhibitions of their work at the Maine Media Workshop in Rockland, Maine   and at the Renaissance Gallery in Carmel, Indiana. They have produced two books on their work.

Books / Articles / DVDs 
John Paul's art is the subject of published articles and books on photography and creativity. A Camera Arts article by Sean Kernan in 1999,  Paul Slaughters 2007 AfterCapture article, and a 2010 Scott Sheppard Nik Radio interview,  discuss John's creative process. His images have been included in over 20 books on Fine Art Photography.

John Paul contributes to photographic and news publications. These include - Camera Arts, Digital Photo Pro, Apple, and The Huffington Post.  In 2000 Adobe Press published his first book "Adobe Master Class".  It was followed up with a second printing in 2003. This book describes techniques and use of digital technology for artistic purposes. He has also self-published catalogs of his work. John has authored ten DVDs on Photoshop techniques through Acme Educational, a digital media learning resource.

Reading 
John Paul Caponigro started his website Illuminating Creativity in 2005.  The educators website includes information on his workshops, seminars, books, DVDs, prints, gallery exhibits, links to environmental groups, a current calendar of lectures and seminars and the artists' curriculum vitae.  The website includes downloadable PDF's on creativity, printing and photographic techniques and bookmaking.

References

External links 
 www.johnpaulcaponigro.com
 www.digitalphotodestinations.com
 John Paul Caponigro at Acme Educational, DVD's on Fine Art Photography
 John Paul Caponigro's workshop; Photography workshop with John Paul Caponigro in Iceland

1965 births
Living people
Artists from Boston
American photographers
Landscape photographers